Lazar Jovanović (1898 – 28 January 1975) was a Yugoslav sports shooter. He competed in the 25 m pistol event at the 1936 Summer Olympics.

References

1898 births
1975 deaths
Yugoslav male sport shooters
Olympic shooters of Yugoslavia
Shooters at the 1936 Summer Olympics